In the United States, the federal transportation bill refers to any of a number of multi-year funding bills for surface transportation programs.  These have included:

 Surface Transportation and Uniform Relocation Assistance Act, 1987
 Intermodal Surface Transportation Efficiency Act (ISTEA), 1991
 The National Highway System Designation Act (NHS), 1995
 Transportation Equity Act for the 21st Century (TEA-21), 1998
 Safe, Accountable, Flexible, Efficient Transportation Equity Act: A Legacy for Users (SAFETEA-LU), 2005
 Moving Ahead for Progress in the 21st Century Act (MAP-21), 2012
 Fixing America’s Surface Transportation Act (FAST), 2015
 Infrastructure Investment and Jobs Act, 2021

Previous multi-year highway spending bills were known as Federal-Aid Highway Acts.

United States federal transportation legislation